The 1964 Wandsworth Council election took place on 7 May 1964 to elect members of Wandsworth London Borough Council in England. The whole council was up for election and the Labour party gained control of the council.

Background
These elections were the first to the newly formed borough. Previously elections had taken place in the Metropolitan Borough of Battersea and Metropolitan Borough of Wandsworth. These boroughs were merged by the London Government Act 1963 to form the new London Borough of Wandsworth.

A total of 169 candidates stood in the election for the 60 seats being contested across 20 wards. These included a full slate from the Conservative and Labour parties, while the Liberals stood 35 candidates. Other candidates included 15 Communists, 4 Independents and 1 Rad Lib. All wards were three-seat wards.

This election had aldermen as well as directly elected councillors.  Labour won all 10 aldermen.

The Council was elected in 1964 as a "shadow authority" but did not start operations until 1 April 1965.

Election result
The results saw Labour gain the new council with a majority of 34 after winning 47 of the 60 seats. Overall turnout in the election was 35.0%. This turnout included 1,514 postal votes.

Ward results

References

1964
1964 London Borough council elections